Temperance Temple (also known as Women's Temple or Woman's Temple) served as the headquarters of the National Woman's Christian Temperance Union (WCTU). It was located in Chicago, Illinois at the southwest corner of LaSalle Street and Monroe Street, in the center of city's financial district. Work was begun in July, 1890, and the building was ready for occupancy in May 1892. The TBAC, a stock company with Marshall Field president of the board of trustees, owned The Temple, the third of the affiliated interests of the National WCTU. Temperance Temple was demolished in 1926.

History

Fourteen years after women inaugurated the temperance crusade and organized the Woman's Christian Temperance Union, the organization had no less than 43 separate and distinct lines of work. It need a national headquarters for its constituency, which numbered 200,000 women, besides 200,000 boys and girls in the Loyal Temperance Legions. Around 1883, the need of a national building and large income impressed itself upon Matilda Carse. With the co-operation of Frances Willard, Carse began planning for the erection of building in Chicago, to be known as the Temperance Temple. In pursuance of this long-contemplated plan, on the July 13, 1887, the TBAC was incorporated. When the stock is all sold  worth of bonds, bearing 5 per cent interest, would be issued.

The local societies of the WCTU were asked to give  towards this enterprise. There were 10,000 local unions in the U.S. at the time. If but one-half of these gave  each, the Association would reach the desired half-million, which is the amount of the capital stock. In order, however, to give the unions sufficient time to raise this sum, the stock was to be sold to capitalists who were friendly to the cause, with the privilege of buying it back again within five years, with the understanding, also, that the dividends were not to exceed 5 per cent annually. It was hoped that at the end of five years, the desired  will be raised by the unions, with which the corporation would buy up the entire capital stock for the National Society.

This building was projected to bring in a rental amounting, at the lowest calculation, to  a year. With this money, the Association proposed to pay off the  bonded debt. When the building was clear of debt, the National WCTU, having free headquarters, would also receive half the income from the rentals. The other half would go to the States. The States would receive a pro rata of this dividend in proportion to the amount they had given toward the building fund. Construction costs were estimated to be .

The Board of Temple Trustees was secured in January 1892. On the board were four men, some of them being among the largest capitalists of Chicago. The board also included: Frances Willard, Helen Louise Hood, Lady Henry Somerset, as well as Mesdames Marion Howard Dunham, Mary Torrans Lathrap, Helen Morton Barker, Clara Cleghorn Hoffman , Susan Fessenden, W. H. Munnell, Lillian M. N. Stevens, Ellen Louise Demorest, Harriet B. Kells, and Caroline M. Clark Woodward.

Esther Pugh, National WCTU treasurer, was the recipient of a steady stream of donations from all the States and Territories of the U.S., and from Europe, Japan, and India. 

The building was designed by John Wellborn Root. Its cornerstone was laid with impressive ceremonies on November 1, 1890. Root died in 1891, and the building was ready for occupancy in May 1892. The Woman's Temperance Publishing Association house was headquartered in the building, as well as the Central Chicago WCTU. Most of the building, however, was rented and the initial income from this source was  a  year.

The heavy yearly ground rental —— was each year the first financial obligation to be met from Temple rental receipts. Carse, a member of the board of trustees and president of the Central WCTU of Chicago, was the chief promoter of plans for its ownership by the WCTU. The untiring but vain endeavor of the National WCTU towards such ownershop covered a period of eleven years. Willard Hall was the soul of the Temple Building. The strength of its appeal to Frances Willard and the active workers of that decade cannot be overestimated. Daily, it was the scene of a noontide gospel temperance meeting, which perpetuated the old Farwell Hall daily prayer service of the early years of the Chicago WCTU.

Following Willard's death in February, 1898, her successor to the presidency of the National WCTU, Lillian M. N. Stevens, with her co-officers and members of the Official Board made every possible effort to carry to successful completion certain plans adopted at the Buffalo, New York, convention in 1897. This program featured an endeavor to raise  to pay off the purchasers of Temple Trust Bonds, issued by Carse "as an individual for and on behalf of the National WCTU."

It became necessary to call a meeting of the National Executive Committee to discuss the Temple situation. This meeting was held in Chicago, July 15, 1898. After two days of discussion, a resolution to be recommended to the national convention was adopted, providing that all effort on the part of the National WCTU to own the Temple Building should be discontinued. "While not legally bound," the resolution stated, "we regard it as a sacred trust to puchase before the next convention the  worth of Temple Trust Bonds issued by the promoters of The Temple enterprise." At the National WCTU convention in Saint Paul, Minnesota, a few months later, after prolonged and dispassionate discussion, these recommendations were adopted and The Temple as an affiliated interest was discontinued.

The building was demolished in 1926.

Location

A valuable lot with a frontage on three streets was locataed at the southwest corner of LaSalle and Monroe streets, in the business portion of Chicago. A legal dispute arose between Marshall Field and his business partner, Levi Leiter, who owned property adjoining, and the work planned by Field was abandoned, the lot fenced in for three or four years. The Woman's Temperance Building Association secured a 99 year lease of the property from Field.

The only way it could be secured was by a lease-hold title. The lease, however, was perpetual, and the charge for ground rent,  a year, could never be increased.

Architecture and fittings

The building was a combination of the old Gothic and the more modern French architecture styles.  Little  wood  was  used  in  the  construction and  the  building  was  fireproof.

For  the  first  two  stories,  the  material  used was  gray granite  with  a  dash  of  pink  running  through  it. Above  that was  used  pressed brick  and terra cotta. This  harmonized  nicely  with  the  granite,  taking  on a  tone  and  color  the  same,  with  the  exception  that  it  is  a  darker  pink. In  shape, the  building was  somewhat  novel for its day, likened  to  the  letter "H". It consisted of two immense wings united by a middle  portion, or viaculum.

The  lower  courts  and  halls were resplendent  with marble mosaic paving,  while  plain  marble was  used  in  the upper  halls.

In  height,  the  temple was  a skyscraper, extending thirteen stories. A pleasing  effect was gained  by  causing  the  building  line  to  retreat  at  the  tenth  story  where  the immense  roof,  containing  three  stories,  commenced,  breaking  as  it  ascended, into gothic  turrets. On  the  granite  around  the entrance were  carved the  coats  of  arms  of  the  various  States  of  the  Union.  Upon  the  corner  stone was  engraved  the  national  legend  of  the  WCTU,  "For God, for Home and Native Land, 1890."  On  the  reverse  was  the WCTU  monogram  and  beneath, "organized 1874". 

On  the  lower  floor  were located  three  banks  and  a  memorial  hall,  known  as Willard  Hall, named in honor of Frances Willard.

A  record  of  the  work  done  in  each  State  in  the  Union was kept in a  large  vault  opening off the  hall.

Notable people
 Helen Morton Barker
 Matilda Carse
 Ellen Louise Demorest
 Marion Howard Dunham
 Susan Fessenden
 Marshall Field
 Clara Cleghorn Hoffman 
 Helen Louise Hood
 Harriet B. Kells
 Mary Torrans Lathrap
 Mrs. W. H. Munnell
 Esther Pugh
 John Wellborn Root
 Lady Henry Somerset
 Lillian M. N. Stevens
 Frances Willard
 Caroline M. Clark Woodward

References

Source attribution

External links
 1895 financial report by Matilda Carse, National Woman's Christian Temperance Union Twenty-Second Annual Meeting held in Music Hall, Baltimore, Maryland, October 18-23, 1895

1892 architecture
1892 establishments in Illinois
1926 disestablishments in Illinois
Commercial buildings completed in 1892
Buildings and structures demolished in 1926
Woman's Christian Temperance Union
Skyscraper office buildings in Chicago
Former buildings and structures in Chicago
Demolished buildings and structures in Chicago